The 2004 FIS Ski Jumping Grand Prix was the 11th Summer Grand Prix season in ski jumping on plastic. The season began on 31 July 2004 in Hinterzarten, Germany and ended on 26 September 2004 in Hakuba, Japan.

Other competitive circuits this season included the World Cup and the Continental Cup.

Calendar

Men

Men's team

Standings

Overall

After 7 events.

Nations Cup

After 9 events.

References

Grand Prix
FIS Grand Prix Ski Jumping